Alden Bradford (17 November 1765 – 26 October 1843) was an American politician, clergyman and author who served as the 5th Massachusetts Secretary of the Commonwealth. Born in Duxbury, Massachusetts, he graduated from Harvard in 1786 and received a degree of LL.D. there. He was then ordained as a Congregational church pastor, serving in Wiscasset, Maine. After moving to Boston he served from 1812 to 1824 as secretary of the Commonwealth of Massachusetts. At times a bookseller and journalist, his works included a History of Massachusetts and Memoir of the Life and Writings of Rev. Jonathan Mayhew.

He was a descendant of William Bradford (Plymouth Colony governor) (c.1590-1647).

Alden Bradford built (or arranged to have built) the Bradford House, built 1794, a historic house in Wiscasset Historic District.

Notes

1765 births
1843 deaths
People from Duxbury, Massachusetts
Secretaries of the Commonwealth of Massachusetts
19th-century American people
Harvard College alumni
Harvard Law School alumni